The 1921 Oregon Agricultural Aggies football team represented Oregon Agricultural College (now known as Oregon State University) in the Pacific Coast Conference (PCC) during the 1921 college football season.  In their second season under head coach R. B. Rutherford, the Beavers compiled a 4–3–2 record (1–2–1 against PCC opponents), finished in fourth place in the PCC, and outscored their opponents, 231 to 42.  Chuck Rose was the team captain. Fullback Gap Powell was selected as an All-American by Football World and Athletic World. The team played its home games at Bell Field in Corvallis, Oregon.

Schedule

References

Oregon Agricultural
Oregon State Beavers football seasons
Oregon Agricultural Aggies football